Buddleja polycephala is a shrub endemic to southern Ecuador and areas around Ayabaca and Piura, and Cajamarca in Peru, at elevations of 2,000 – 2,700 m. The species was first named and described by Kunth in 1818.

Description
Buddleja polycephala is a dioecious sprawling shrub 1 – 5 m tall. The young branches are quadrangular and tomentose, bearing ovate or ovate-lanceolate membranaceous leaves 9 – 25 cm long by 4 – 10 cm wide, initially thickly tomentose but later glabrescent above, but remaining tomentose below. The yellowish white inflorescences are 15 – 40 cm long, and as wide at the base, with leafy-bracted primary and secondary branches perpendicular to each other. The flowers are borne as compact heads, approximately 1 cm in diameter, each with around 20 flowers, the corollas 3 mm long.

Cultivation
The species is not known to be in cultivation.

Varieties
Norman  identifies two varieties, both distinguished by minor differences in the leaves:
 Buddleja polycephala Kunth var. polycephala 
 Buddleja polycephala Kunth var. peruviana (J. F. Macbr.) E. M. Norman

References

polycephala
Flora of Ecuador
Flora of Peru
Flora of South America
Dioecious plants